Death Notice may refer to:

 Death notice, a type of obituary
 "Death Notice", an episode of the Starsky & Hutch television series
 Death Notice (novel), a 2014 work of detective fiction
 Death Notice (film), a 2022 Hong Kong action thriller based on the book